Gambrell is a surname. Notable people with the surname include:

Billy Gambrell (born 1941), former American football wide receiver in the National Football League
David H. Gambrell (1929–2021), American politician and Georgia attorney who represented his state in the United States Senate from 1971 through 1972
Dorothy Gambrell, cartoonist who writes and draws the online comic strip Cat and Girl
Dylan Gambrell (born 1996), American ice hockey player
James Bruton Gambrell (1841–1921), American Baptist minister
 Jamey Gambrell (1954–2020), American translator of Russian literature, and an expert in modern art
Marilyn Gambrell, American parole officer turned teacher who started the program No More Victims at the M.B. Smiley High School in Houston, Texas
Michael Gambrell (born 1958), American politician